Sir Barry Albert Cross  (17 March 1925 – 27 April 1994) was a British biologist.  He was a fellow of  Corpus Christi College, Cambridge. He was knighted in 1989.

References 

1925 births
1994 deaths
British biologists
Fellows of the Royal Society
Fellows of the Zoological Society of London
Secretaries of the Zoological Society of London
Knights Bachelor
Commanders of the Order of the British Empire
Fellows of Corpus Christi College, Cambridge
20th-century biologists